The Women's artistic individual all-around gymnastics competition at the 2018 Commonwealth Games in Gold Coast, Australia was held on 7 April 2018 at the Coomera Indoor Sports Centre.

Schedule
The schedule is as follows:

All times are Australian Eastern Standard Time (UTC+10:00)

Results

Qualification

Qualification for this all-around final was determined within the team final.

Final
The results are as follows:

References

Gymnastics at the 2018 Commonwealth Games